Vladimir Cvetković (born 24 May 1941) is a Serbian former basketball player and sports administrator who is the honorary president of Crvena zvezda. He played with KK Crvena zvezda for 13 seasons. With Crvena zvezda he won 2 National Championships and 1 National Cup. He spent his entire playing career with KK Crvena zvezda.

Cvetković's historical free-throws
The Yugoslav national team won their first Olympic medal in Mexico in 1968. The Yugoslavs played well and placed themselves into the semifinals where they played versus the Soviet Union. In a clash between basketball David and Goliath, in front of 22.000 supporters who gave their sympathies to David, i.e. Yugoslav team, the key man of the match was player of KK Crvena zvezda, Vladimir Cvetković.

Seven seconds before the end of the match, at the result 61–60 for Yugoslavia, Cvetković scored two free throws for 63–61. In between the free throws, he kissed his wedding band for good luck. The Soviets had enough time to reduce to 63–62, but not enough time to avoid defeat. The celebration of the host for the victory of the Yugoslav team quickly hauled from the hall to the streets of Ciudad Mexico and lasted till daybreak.

The team of the USA was a too strong rival in the finals and the Yugoslav team was defeated with 50–65 scoring the second place in the basketball tournament.

See also
 List of father-and-son combinations who have played for Crvena zvezda
 List of KK Crvena zvezda players with 100 games played
 Yugoslav First Federal Basketball League career stats leaders
 KK Crvena zvezda accomplishments and records
 List of Yugoslav First Federal Basketball League annual scoring leaders

References

 Veliki Vladimir at mojacrvenazvezda.net 

1941 births
Living people
Basketball players at the 1964 Summer Olympics
Basketball players at the 1968 Summer Olympics
Competitors at the 1967 Mediterranean Games
KK Crvena zvezda players
Medalists at the 1968 Summer Olympics
Mediterranean Games gold medalists for Yugoslavia
Olympic medalists in basketball
Olympic basketball players of Yugoslavia
Olympic silver medalists for Yugoslavia
Sportspeople from Loznica
Red Star Belgrade non-playing staff
Serbian sports executives and administrators
Serbian men's basketball players
Socialist Party of Serbia politicians
Yugoslav men's basketball players
1963 FIBA World Championship players
1967 FIBA World Championship players
Mediterranean Games medalists in basketball
Forwards (basketball)